In enzymology, a fluoroacetaldehyde dehydrogenase is an enzyme that catalyzes the chemical reaction

fluoroacetaldehyde + NAD+ + H2O  fluoroacetate + NADH + 2 H+

The 3 substrates of this enzyme are fluoroacetaldehyde, NAD+, and H2O, whereas its 3 products are fluoroacetate, NADH, and H+.

This enzyme belongs to the family of oxidoreductases, specifically those acting on the aldehyde or oxo group of donor with NAD+ or NADP+ as acceptor.  The systematic name of this enzyme class is fluoroacetaldehyde:NAD+ oxidoreductase.

References

 
 

EC 1.2.1
NADH-dependent enzymes
Enzymes of unknown structure